Field hockey events were contested at the 1998 Asian Games in Bangkok, Thailand. The winner of each tournament qualified for the 2000 Summer Olympics.

Medalists

Men's tournament

Groups round

Group A

Group B

Final round

Ninth and tenth place classification

Fifth to eighth place classification

Medal round

Semifinals

Final

Final standings

References
 Men Field Hockey Asia Games 1998 Bangkok

 
1998 Asian Games events
1998
Asian Games
1998 Asian Games
Asian Games
1998